Bursa Orhangazi University, named after Ottoman bey Orhan Gazi, was a private university in Bursa, Turkey. Established in 2011, the university was one out of fifteen private universities that were closed by the Turkish government in the course of the 2016 Turkish purges.

References

External links
  

Private universities and colleges in Turkey
Education in Bursa
Educational institutions established in 2011
2011 establishments in Turkey
Educational institutions shut down in the 2016 Turkish purges
Defunct universities and colleges in Turkey